Maher El-Beheiry (born 17 March 1943) was President of the Supreme Constitutional Court of Egypt. He succeeded Farouk Sultan as president of the court on 1 July 2012. He served for a year, until 1 July 2013, when he was succeeded by Adly Mansour. For a time during the 2013 Egyptian coup d'état, some organizations reported El-Beheiry as having been selected for the position of acting President of Egypt. However, these reports were incorrect: Mansour, the current court president, was selected as acting president.

References

1943 births
21st-century Egyptian judges
Living people
People of the Egyptian revolution of 2011